Schmidt Hills is a group of rock hills, 15 nautical miles (28 km) long, lying north of Childs Glacier and west of Roderick Valley in the Neptune Range, Pensacola Mountains. Mapped by United States Geological Survey (USGS) from surveys and U.S. Navy air photos, 1956–66. Named by Advisory Committee on Antarctic Names (US-ACAN) for Dwight L. Schmidt, USGS geologist to the Pensacola Mountains in 1962–63, 1963–64 and 1965–66.

Features
Geographical features include:

 Mount Coulter
 Mount Gorecki
 Mount Nervo
 Pepper Peak
 Robbins Nunatak
 Wall Rock

Hills of Queen Elizabeth Land
Pensacola Mountains